Elachista louiseae is a moth of the family Elachistidae. It is found in Spain.

References

louiseae
Moths described in 1992
Moths of Europe